She Loves Me Not is a 1918 American short comedy film featuring Harold Lloyd. A print of the film survives at the film archive of the British Film Institute.

Cast
 Harold Lloyd 
 Snub Pollard 
 Bebe Daniels 
 Sammy Brooks
 Billy Fay
 William Gillespie
 Estelle Harrison
 Lew Harvey
 Bud Jamison
 Margaret Joslin
 Dee Lampton
 Oscar Larson
 Marie Mosquini
 James Parrott
 Dorothea Wolbert
 Noah Young

See also
 Harold Lloyd filmography

References

External links

1918 films
American silent short films
1918 comedy films
1918 short films
American black-and-white films
Silent American comedy films
American comedy short films
1910s American films